Streptomyces sasae is a Gram-positive bacterium species from the genus of Streptomyces which has been isolated from rhizosphere soil from the bamboo Sasa borealis in Damyang in Korea.

See also 
 List of Streptomyces species

References

External links 

Type strain of Streptomyces sasae at BacDive -  the Bacterial Diversity Metadatabase

sasae
Bacteria described in 2015